Saber Ben Frej  (born 3 July 1979, in Kerker) is a Tunisian footballer.

Club career
During the first half of the 2007–08 season, Ben Frej scored nine goals in 13 games for Etoile du Sahel, before moving to Le Mans UC72 in January 2008. On 4 January 2010, his club have released the Tunisian defender, becoming a free agent.

References

External links
 

1979 births
Living people
Tunisian footballers
Association football defenders
Tunisia international footballers
2008 Africa Cup of Nations players
Étoile Sportive du Sahel players
Le Mans FC players
Ligue 1 players
ES Hammam-Sousse players